Tân Bình is an urban district of Ho Chi Minh City, Vietnam. The city's international airport is situated in the district. It consists of 15 wards, from Ward 1 to Ward 15. It occupies . In the 2019 census, Tân Bình district has a population of 474,792 people.

Geography

Tân Bình is situated within the urban core of Ho Chi Minh City. It borders Phú Nhuận and District 3 to the east, Tân Phú to the west, District 10 and District 11 to the south, District 12 and Gò Vấp to the north.

Most of the district landscape is flat.

Demographics

As of the April 1, 2019 census, there were 133,745 households and 474,792 residents in the district. 16.5% were under the age of 14, 77.5% from 15 to 64, and 6% who were 65 years of age or older. For every 100 females, there were 94.0 males.

Ethnic groups
In 2004, the population was predominantly ethnic Vietnamese (Kinh) with 93.33%. The second-largest ethnic group was the Chinese (Hoa) with 6.38%. Other ethnic groups included Khmer with 0.11%, Tày with 0,05%, Nùng with 0,03%, Mường with 0,02%, Chăm with 0,02% and Thái with 0,01% of the population.

Religion
According to the 1999 census, 56.68% reported to be non-religious, 22.9% practiced Catholicism, 19.62% practiced Buddhism, 0.4% practiced Cao Dai, 0.37% practiced Protestantism, 0.02% were Muslims while 0.01% followed Hoa Hao.

Economy
Pacific Airlines and Vietnam Air Services Company have their headquarters in the district. VietJet Air has its Ho Chi Minh City office in the district as well.

Education
Tân Bình district has one of the most notable high schools in Ho Chi Minh City, the Nguyễn Thượng Hiền High School. Other public high schools are Nguyễn Chí Thanh High School, Nguyễn Thái Bình High School and one of the most popular private high school in Ho Chi Minh City, Lý Tự Trọng High School.

Tân Bình School's Disability Workplace Education and Training Project is a collaborative project involving Tân Bình District Department of Education and Training, RMIT University's Department of Social and Community Services and the Loreto Vietnam Australia Program (LVAP). The project is funded by the Australian Government International Aid Program (AusAID) and technical support is provided by AVI (Australian Volunteers International).

Consulates
The district hosts several consulates:

References

External links

Quận Tân Bình Official site.
Hue Street Food in Tân Bình District
Things to Do in Tân Bình District, Ho Chi Minh

Districts of Ho Chi Minh City